Ivan Yakovych Horbachevsky (Ivan Jakovyč Horbačevskyj; 5 May 1854, Zarubińce – 24 May 1942, Prague) also known as Jan Horbaczewski, Johann Horbaczewski or Ivan Horbaczewski, was an eminent Austrian chemist and politician of Ukrainian origin.

From 1872 to 1878 he studied medicine at the University of Vienna, Austria. In 1883 he was appointed extraordinary professor and, in 1884, ordinary professor at the University of Prague by the Emperor, and was the rector of the same university for a time. He is particularly known for his contributions in organic chemistry and biochemistry. He was the first to synthesise uric acid from glycine in 1882. He also noticed that aminoacids were building blocks of proteins. Horbachevsky worked in Austria, Czechoslovakia, Hungary and Ukraine. It was as though the Dual Monarchy was responding to the Spanish flu when, on 30 July 1918, Imperial Councillor Ivan Horbachevsky was appointed by imperial decree the empire’s first health minister.

References

External links 

 Biographie in http://portal.unesco.org/
 Выдающиеся химики мира: Биогр.справочник/В.Волков,Е.Вонский,Г.Кузнецова.-М.,1991.
 Віталій Абліцов «Галактика «Україна». Українська діаспора: видатні постаті» – К.: КИТ, 2007. - 436 с.

1854 births
1942 deaths
People from Ternopil Oblast
People from the Kingdom of Galicia and Lodomeria
Ukrainian Austro-Hungarians
19th-century Ukrainian people
20th-century Ukrainian people
19th-century chemists
20th-century chemists
Ukrainian chemists
Ukrainian biochemists
Austrian chemists
Czech chemists
Gout researchers
Ukrainian expatriates in Austria
Ukrainian expatriates in Hungary
Ukrainian expatriates in the Czech Republic